Kate Clark  is a museum director and archaeologist. She was elected a Fellow of the Society of Antiquaries of London in 2000. Clark was Director of Sydney Living Museums between 2008 and 2013 and the CEO of Cadw from 2014. Before that, she also worked for English Heritage, the Heritage Lottery Fund, the Council for British Archaeology, and the Ironbridge Gorge Museum.

References

External links 

Women archaeologists
21st-century British archaeologists
Fellows of the Society of Antiquaries of London
Living people
Year of birth missing (living people)
Cadw